Countrywise (known as Countrywise: Guide to Britain since 2016) is a British television series on ITV, which looks at the best of Britain's coast and country. The programme is currently presented by Ben Fogle and Liz Bonnin.

Format
Classical historian Bettany Hughes formerly appeared on the programme, and was introduced as the "Countrywise historian".

The fourth series of the programme began broadcast on 25 June 2012, when it came from the Isle of Man and mentioned the Manx cat. A more recent edition of the programme has come from Ireland. This edition of the programme mentioned how the newest member of the Countrywise team has been the programme's scientist, Charlotte Uhlenbroek, who discussed Finn MacCool when the programme was in Ireland.

In late July 2012, the programme was broadcast in Pembrokeshire, Wales, where it visited the smallest city in the United Kingdom, that of St. Davids.

2013 return
The show returned on 2 September 2013 with presenter Paul Heiney and two new co-hosts, Ben Fogle and Liz Bonnin. The same format continued for the sixth and seventh series in 2014 and 2015. Paul Heiney did not return to the show for the eighth series in 2016. Bonnin and Fogle now present Countrywise.

Since 2016, the show has been renamed Countrywise: Guide to Britain.

Episodes

Specials

On-air team

Main presenters
Paul Heiney (2009–2016)
Ben Fogle (2013—)
Liz Bonnin (2013—)

Reporters
Bettany Hughes (formerly)
Charlotte Uhlenbroek (formerly)

Countrywise Kitchen presenters
Paul Heiney
Mike Robinson

Countrywise Kitchen
Countrywise launched a new series in December 2010 called Countrywise Kitchen, about foraging for food and food connected with different parts of the country. The edition broadcast on 10 December 2010 mentioned gathering mushrooms, and mentioned the cep mushroom.

It was a spin-off from the regular series and was co-presented by Paul Heiney and Mike Robinson between 2010 and 2012.

See also
Countryfile

References

External links

Official Twitter

2009 British television series debuts
2010s British television series
ITV documentaries
Television series by ITV Studios
English-language television shows